The LXXVI Panzer Corps (LXXVI Panzerkorps, 76th Armoured Corps) was a panzer corps of Nazi Germany during World War II. The headquarters were formed in France under Army Group D on 29 June 1943 as LXXVI Army Corps but renamed a month later. In August it shipped to Italy to become part of 10th Army. It spent the rest of the war in Italy fighting in the Italian Campaign mainly under 10th Army but with short periods from February 1944 (Battle of Anzio) and January 1945 (Spring 1945 offensive in Italy) under 14th Army. The Corps was commanded for most of its active fighting by General Traugott Herr.

Order of battle
In 1943 the corps included:
 1st Parachute Division
 26th Panzer Division
 65th Infantry Division
 90th Panzergrenadier Division

On 25 August 1944 the composition of the corps was:
 1st Parachute Division
 278th Infantry Division
 71st Infantry Division
 5th Mountain Division
 162nd Turkestan Division

Commanding officers
Lieutenant-General (Generalleutnant) Traugott Herr, 23 July - 31 August 1943 (acting)
General of Armoured troops (General der Panzertruppe) Traugott Herr, 1 September 1943 – 28 February 1944
Lieutenant-General  Dietrich von Choltitz, 28 February 1944 – 15 April 1944 (acting)
General of Armoured troops Traugott Herr, 15 April 1944 – 23 November 1944
Lieutenant-General Friedrich-Wilhelm Hauck, 24 November - 16 December 1944 (acting)
General of Armoured troops Traugott Herr, 17–26 December 1944
Lieutenant-General Gerhard Graf von Schwerin, 27 December 1944 - 31 March 1945 (acting)
General of Armoured troops Gerhard Graf von Schwerin, 31 March – 25 April 1945
Lieutenant-General Karl von Graffen, 25 April 1945 – 8 May 1945 (acting)

Area of operations 

Source: Lexicon der Wehrmacht and Axis History Factbook

References
Sources
 Lexicon der Wehrmacht
 Axis History Factbook
Citations

P076
Military units and formations established in 1943
Military units and formations disestablished in 1945